Khezr Konar (also Romanized as Khezr Konār) is a village in Goli Jan Rural District, in the Central District of Tonekabon County, Mazandaran Province, Iran. At the 2006 census, its population was 721, in 206 families.

References 

Populated places in Tonekabon County